Timbillica is a locality in the Bega Valley Shire of New South Wales, Australia.

Demographics
At the 2016 census, the median age of persons in Timbillica was 56 years. There were less males than females, with 37.5% of the population male and 62.5% female. The average household size was 2 people per household.

References

Localities in New South Wales
Bega Valley Shire